Thornhill Academy, (formerly known as Thornhill School) is a co-educational secondary school located in Sunderland, Tyne and Wear, England.

It was a community school administered by Sunderland City Council, and had a specialism in business and enterprise. In September 2017 Thornhill School converted to academy status and was renamed Thornhill Academy. The school is now sponsored by the Consilium Academies Trust.

Thornhill Academy admits pupils mainly from Barnes Junior School, Diamond Hall Junior School, Hudson Road Primary School and Richard Avenue Primary School.

The school offers GCSEs and BTECs as programmes of study for pupils. Graduating students often go on to study at the Bede Sixth Form, a sixth form consortium including Thornhill Academy and Sunderland College.

References

External links
Thornhill Academy official website

Secondary schools in the City of Sunderland
Academies in the City of Sunderland
Sunderland